The Kosovo national under-21 football team is the national under-21 football team of Kosovo and is controlled by the Football Federation of Kosovo. The team is considered to be the feeder team for the Kosovo national team.

History

Permitting by FIFA to play friendlies
On 6 February 2013, FIFA gave the permission to play international friendly games against other member associations. Whereas, on 13 January 2014, there was a change of this permit that forbade Kosovo to play against the national teams of the countries of the former Yugoslavia. Club teams were also allowed to play friendlies and this happened after a FIFA Emergency Committee meeting. However, it was stipulated that clubs and representative teams of the Football Federation of Kosovo may not display national symbols as flags, emblems, etc. or play national anthems. The go-ahead was given after meetings between the Football Association of Serbia and Sepp Blatter.

Membership in UEFA and FIFA

In September 2015 at an UEFA Executive Committee meeting in Malta was approved the request from the federation to the admission in UEFA to the next Ordinary Congress to be held in Budapest. On 3 May 2016, at the Ordinary Congress. Kosovo were accepted into UEFA after members voted 28–24 in favor of Kosovo. Ten days later, Kosovo was accepted in FIFA during their 66th congress in Mexico with 141 votes in favour and 23 against.

2019 UEFA European Under-21 Championship qualifications
On 26 January 2017, in Nyon, it was decided that Kosovo should be part in Group 5 of the 2019 UEFA European Under-21 Championship qualification, together with Azerbaijan, Germany, Israel, Norway and Republic of Ireland. On 25 March 2017, Kosovo made his debut on UEFA European Under-21 Championship qualifications with a 1–0 away defeat in against Republic of Ireland. On 29 July 2017, UEFA confirmed that the match in which Kosovo had lost with a deep score 0–5 against Norway was given as a 3–0 victory for Kosovo, this happened after in that match for Norway had played Kristoffer Ajer who was suspended. This match for Kosovo was the first victory in a qualifying match for a major tournament. Kosovo would secure another dramatic win against Norway at home with 3–2 by two goals from Enis Bytyqi and one from Florent Hasani, that was Kosovo's first home win in their history at this competition.

2021 UEFA European Under-21 Championship qualifications
On 11 December 2018, in Nyon, it was decided that Kosovo should be part in Group 3 of the 2021 UEFA European Under-21 Championship qualification, together with Albania, Andorra, Austria, England and Turkey. Before the start of this qualifying cycle, Kosovo in March 2019 played two friendly matches in Antalya with Turkmenistan which won with a narrow score of 3–2, and with Malta which won with a minimum score of 1–0, in the composition of Kosovo was the players who would potentially be part of the national team during the qualifying cycle. On 6 June 2019, Kosovo started the qualifying cycle against Andorra which they defeated with a deep score 4–0 and this match is their best result yet. Kosovo would follow this great result after beating Turkey at home with 3-1 showing a great display. Also leading the qualifying table, for the first time in their history. Success wouldn't follow as Kosovo than lost a string of five matches in the process in which they only scored two goals. Against Albania losing away with 2-1 in Elbasan. Kosovo would secure their third win against Andorra at home with a close 1-0 win. Their last match ended in a devastating loss against Turkey in Istanbul with 3-0 their seventh loss in total. Kosovo finished their Qualifying in 5th place with nine points, only above Andorra, but trailing behind Turkey, Albania, Austria and Group winners England.

Competitive record

UEFA European Under-21 Championship
On 26 January 2017, in Nyon, it was decided that Kosovo should be part in Group 5 of the 2019 UEFA European Under-21 Championship qualification, together with Azerbaijan, Germany, Israel, Norway and Republic of Ireland. On 25 March 2017, Kosovo made his debut on UEFA European Under-21 Championship qualifications with a 1–0 away defeat in against Republic of Ireland.

Non-FIFA Tournament
Kosovo U21 has so far only participated in one international tournament in Valais Youth Cup, a two-day international football tournament. In which they finished in fourth place. Their first match was against Ghana in which they lost.

Fixtures and results

2022

2023

2024

Players

Current squad
The following players were called up for the friendly matches against Moldova and Turkey, on 24 and 27 March 2023.
All caps and goals as of 14 June 2022 after match against Albania, only matches as FIFA member are included.
Players in bold have been called up or have played at least one full international match with national senior team.

Recent call-ups
The following players have been called up for the team within the last 12 months and are still available for selection.

Notes
PRE = Preliminary squad/standby.
INJ = The player is not part of the current squad due to injury.
A = Was called up from national senior squad.

Coaching staff

Head-to-head records against other countries
Head-to-head records are included only matches as FIFA member.

See also
Men's
National team
Under-19
Under-17
Under-15
Futsal
Women's
National team
Under-19
Under-17

Notes and references

Notes

References

External links
 
Kosovo U21 News about the team

Under-21
European national under-21 association football teams